Jacoba Maria van Nickelen (1690, Haarlem – 1749, Amsterdam), was an 18th-century flower painter from the Northern Netherlands.

Biography 

van Nicklen was born into an old painting family of Haarlem; her grandfather Isaak van Nickelen painted church interiors, and her father Jan van Nickelen was a landscape painter.
According to the RKD she was a fruit and flower still life painter, whose work shows the same elements as the work of Cornelia van der Mijn, the daughter of her teacher Herman van der Mijn. She was active at the court of Johann Wilhelm, Elector Palatine, where besides Cornelia, the women painters Adriana Spilberg and Rachel Ruysch also painted. She married the painter Willem Troost and had eight children, though only two survived infancy.

References

External links 
 

 Jacoba Maria van Nickelen on Artnet
 Jacoba Maria van Nickelen on inghist

1690s births
1749 deaths
18th-century Dutch painters
18th-century Dutch women artists
Artists from Haarlem
Dutch still life painters
Dutch women painters
Flower artists